Mohammed Rabii (born 29 September 2001) is a Moroccan professional footballer who plays as a defender for Ittihad Kalba on loan from Al Jazira in the UAE Pro League.

Career statistics

Club

Notes

References

External links

2001 births
Living people
Moroccan footballers
Moroccan expatriate footballers
Association football defenders
UAE Pro League players
Wydad AC players
Al Jazira Club players
Al-Ittihad Kalba SC players
Expatriate footballers in the United Arab Emirates
Moroccan expatriate sportspeople in the United Arab Emirates